The 1980 All-Ireland Under-21 Hurling Championship final was a hurling match that was played at Walsh Park, Waterford on 14 September 1980 to determine the winners of the 1980 All-Ireland Under-21 Hurling Championship, the 17th season of the All-Ireland Under-21 Hurling Championship, a tournament organised by the Gaelic Athletic Association for the champion teams of the four provinces of Ireland. The final was contested by Tipperary of Munster and Kilkenny of Leinster, with Tipperary winning by 2-9 to 0-14.

Match

Details

References

1980 in hurling
All-Ireland Under-21 Hurling Championship Finals
Tipperary GAA matches
Kilkenny GAA matches